Integrated conservation and development projects (ICDPs) are biodiversity conservation projects with rural development components. This is an approach that aspires to combine social development with conservation goals(Hughes and Flintan 2001). These projects look to deal with biodiversity conservation objectives through the use of socio-economic investment tools. The World Wide Fund for Nature (WWF) first introduced ICDPs in the mid 1980s. They wanted to attend to some of the problems associated with the “fines and fences” (nonparticipatory) approach to conservation (4-Abdoulaye Ndiaye 2001).

ICDPs under WWF 
The Wildlands & Human Needs Program was initiated in 1985 by WWF and incorporated19 ICDPs in 12 countries in Africa and South America. They wanted to improve the quality of life of rural people through projects that integrated the management of natural resources with economic development. Today there are around 300 ICDPs (1-Hughes and Flintan 2001).

Various names of ICDPs 
ICDPs have many different names like “People-Centered Conservation and Development”, “Eco-development”, “grassroots conservation”, community-based natural resource management (CBNRM) and community wildlife management (CWM). 
All of which were created by the conservation organizations, rather than the indigenous people (2-Chapin 2004).

Characteristics of ICDPs 
Biodiversity conservation is the primary goal, but ICDPs also like to deal with the social and economic requirements of communities who might threaten biodiversity. They wish to improve the relationships between state-managed protected areas and their neighbors, but do not inevitably seek to delegate ownership of protected area resources to local communities. They usually receive funding from external sources and are externally motivated and initiated by conservation organizations and development agencies. ICDPs are normally linked to a protected area, usually a national park. (1-Hughes and Fintan 2001) ICDPs, through benefit sharing, are believed to discourage poaching and promote economic development. ICDPs try to benefit indigenous populations in several ways: through the transfer of money from tourism, the creation of jobs, and the stimulation of productivity in agriculture (3-Johannesen 2006).

ICDP assumptions 
ICDPs make many assumptions during their project implementations, each of which may prove true or not:
 Diversified local livelihood options will reduce human pressures on biodiversity, leading to improved conservation.
 Local people and their livelihood practices comprise the most important threat to the biodiversity resources of the area in question.
 ICDPs offer sustainable alternatives to traditional approaches of protected areas management.
(1-Hughes and Flintan 2001)

Critiques of ICDPs 
Conservation organizations do not necessarily understand the social and economic arenas they are trying to work in. They are the ones to start the ICDPs, rather than the rural people, and have little experience working with communities. They are also unwilling to bear or support legal battles over land and are not willing to strengthen rural organizations because they find it to be “too political” (1-Hughes and Flintan 2001). However, WWF claims that ICDPs strengthen local organizations and "broker new land-use agreements between governments and communities, and helping communities challenge encroachment upon their natural resources, ICDPs involve local communities to improve livelihoods and conservation" (6-WWF).

Agroforestry and organic gardening projects do not work as well because it is difficult for indigenous people to market what is grown.

Minority ethnic groups and women are many times not accounted for in the redistribution of costs and benefits. There are many limitations on participation by women, so many feel there are not equal opportunities for all people within the community.

External effects like a growing market demand for forest and wildlife products, demographic pressures and vested interests like illegal logging, mineral extraction and ranching often go disregarded by ICDPs.

In addition, community-based conservation projects are often found to be divergent to the goals of biodiversity conservation, and should be based more on biological sciences.  As stated by Katrina Brandon with, “Not all things can be preserved through use” (2-Chapin 2004).

Another problem is that some of the ICDPs that are funded internationally may not be financially or economically sustainable once their external funding has been exhausted.

Integrated Conservation and Development Practices in Madagascar 
The ICDP in Madagascar has unintentionally led to environmental sustainability and degradation simultaneously. The organization relies on the cheap and local labor of select individuals to enforce their conservation practices among the communities near the forests. Problems occur due to the disparity in wages and lack of communication between the local conservation agents and the government. The conservation agents are placed in the difficult position of doing their duties as workers for the ICDP and their duties as members of the community. On one hand, the conservation agents are required to monitor the forests and prevent peasants and other locals from farming portions of the land, which can become violent and dangerous. These encounters between the hired locals and the rest of the community causes friction between them and run the risk of being shunned.

The local agents are also aware of the wage gap between them and the external officials who work for the ICDP. The high paying jobs are universally given to foreign workers who come into the community while the low paying, harder working jobs are given to the local conservation agents. This recognition has led many local conservation agents to turn a blind eye to illegal logging and unapproved agricultural practices by other peasants. These interactions lead to further destruction of the environment which contradicts the motives and goals of the ICDP. Additionally, the arrival of another conservation organization, ANGAP, has also discouraged locals from continuing their conservation work and are beginning to quit their jobs despite the economic ramifications. These labor tensions surrounding conservation help are rarely discussed as Western authorities continually emphasize the successes while diminishing any failures. This is to continue the ideology that all conservation endeavors are inherently beneficial to everyone involved. However, the Malagasy people are aware of these fallacies and many feel that these conservation organizations are profiteering land for personal gain. Ideas like these continue to cause hesitation among local communities to participate with organizations such as the ICDP.

The ICDP, however, has introduced many conservation activities encouraging participation among local communities. Tools such as lesson plans, trainings, and increasing communications between themselves and the local community have occurred in order to ease tensions and build a better relationship. The Malagasy people hope this will encourage the ICDP to allow them to take over some of the labor given to foreign workers. By replacing these kinds of positions, the locals will achieve better compensation for their work which will ultimately strengthen relationships.

Examples of ICDPs 
Annapurna Conservation Area Project, Nepal
Bwindi Impenetrable Forest, Uganda
Lake Mburo National Park, Uganda
Amboro National Park, Bolivia
Yancheng Coastal Zone Biosphere Reserve, China
Crater Mountain Wildlife Management Area, Papua New Guinea
Mount Elgon, Uganda
Ngorongoro Conservation Area, Tanzanla
Kilim Ijum, Cameroon
Ostional Wildlife Refuge, Costa Rica
Projects funded by the UK Department for International Development (DFID)
For ICDPs to be successful Monitoring and Evaluation (M&E) systems need to be institutionalized and unnecessary data collection avoided.

Related books 
In the Dust of Kilimanjaro - David Western
Indonesia - World Bank
Investing in Biodiversity - Michael Wells

See also
Conservation International
World Wildlife Fund
The Nature Conservancy
Ford Foundation

References 

 Integrating Conservation and Development Experience Ross Hughes and Fiona Flintan, Copyright: 2001, International Institute for Environment and Development https://www.iied.org/sites/default/files/pdfs/migrate/9080IIED.pdf
 World Watch: Vision for a sustainable world, A Challenge to Conservationists, Mac Chapin, Copyright: 2004, Worldwatch Institute
 Designing integrated conservation and development projects (ICDPs): illegal hunting, wildlife conservation, and the welfare of the local people. Johannesen, AB (2006)
 A Practitioner's View of Conservation and Development in Africa: Integrated Management and the Djoudj National Park in Senegal Abdoulaye Ndiaye, Copyright: 2001 Africa Today Consultants, Inc
 http://www.eldis.org
 http://www.panda.org/about_wwf/what_we_do/forests/our_solutions/responsible_forestry/community_forestry/index.cfm

Notes

External links
Case Studies:
 http://app.iucn.org/congress/documents/kmcd/reports/Changqing%20Yu%20-%20Pingwu.pdf
 http://webh01.ua.ac.be/crc/great_apes_cameroon.html
 https://web.archive.org/web/20110725050327/http://bcnet.org/text/projects.htm 
 http://www.worldwildlife.org/bsp/publications/asia/mapping/mapping.pdf

Conservation projects